Anti-nRNP is a type of antibody. 

They are autoantibodies against some ribonucleoproteins.

Anti-nRNP antibodies can be elevated in mixed connective tissue disease.

See also
 snRNP70

References

Autoantibodies